Alessio di Mauro was the defending champion, but lost in the quarterfinals to Víctor Estrella Burgos.

Paolo Lorenzi won the title, defeating Adrián Menéndez-Maceiras in the final, 6–1, 6–3.

Seeds

  Alejandro Falla (first round)
  Paolo Lorenzi (champion)
  Víctor Estrella Burgos (semifinals)
  Adrián Menéndez-Maceiras (final)
  Agustín Velotti (quarterfinals)
  Daniel Muñoz de la Nava (second round)
  Chase Buchanan (first round)
  Nicolas Meister (first round)

Draw

Finals

Top half

Bottom half

References
 Main Draw
 Qualifying Draw

San Luis Potosí Challenger - Singles
2014 Singles